The Maine Mineral and Gem Museum is a geology museum located in Bethel, Maine. It displays a collection of rocks, minerals, and meteorites.

History 
The museum was formed from the possessions within Perham's Maine Mineral Store founded in 1919. Following the closure in 2009, Massachusetts-based philanthropists  Lawrence Stifler and Mary McFadden bought the Perham collection The museum then opened in 2019.

Collection and research 
Notable specimens contained by the museum are:
 The largest chunk of the asteroid 4 Vesta on Earth.
 The largest displays of lunar and Martian meteorites in the world, including the largest piece of the Moon known to exist.
 Petrica quadrifaria, a fossil tree and Maine's state fossil.
 The largest known Martian meteorite, Taoudenni 002.

References 

Museums in Maine
Natural history museums in Maine
Bethel, Maine
Science museums in Maine
Geology museums in the United States
Mineralogy museums
2019 establishments in Maine
Museums established in 2019